Sprog is a graphical tool to build Perl programs by plugging parts (called "gears" in Sprog terminology) together. Given the available gears are mostly for reading and processing data, this program can probably be classified as an ETL (Extract-Transform-Load) tool.

External links
 Sprog web site
 Data Munging with Sprog

Extract, transform, load tools
Perl software